Bound and Gagged is a 1919 American silent film serial produced by George B. Seitz Productions and distributed by Pathé. It was a spoof of the clichéd melodramatic serials of the era.

It was shot in Fort Lee, New Jersey when many early film studios in America's first motion picture industry were based there at the beginning of the 20th century.

Four episodes survive in the Library of Congress film archive.

Cast
Marguerite Courtot as Princess Istra
George B. Seitz as Archibald A. Barlow
Nellie Burt as Margaret Hunter
Harry Semels as Don Esteban Carnero
Frank Redman as Roger Kipley
John Reinhardt as Oscar Ben Glade
Tom Goodwin as Willard Hunter
Joe Cuny as Barcelona Ben
Harry Stone
Bert Starkey

Chapter Titles
 The Wager
 Overboard
 Help! Help!
 An Unwilling Princess
 Held For Ransom
 Out Again, In Again
 The Fatal Error
 Arrested
 A Harmless Princess
 Hopley Takes The Liberty

References

External links
 
 
 Bound and Gagged at Silent Era

1919 films
American black-and-white films
American silent serial films
1910s English-language films
Films directed by George B. Seitz
Films shot in Fort Lee, New Jersey
Pathé Exchange film serials
1919 comedy films
Silent American comedy films
American parody films
1910s American films